Songs of Faith is a 1950 album by Jo Stafford. The album is a collection of hymns and inspirational songs.

Track listing 

 Lead Kindly Light
 Battle Hymn of the Republic       
 In the Garden
 The Old Rugged Cross    
 Nearer, My God, to Thee    
 Abide With Me     
 He Leadeth Me  
 Rock of Ages

References 

1950 albums
Jo Stafford albums
Christian music albums by American artists